Finite spherical symmetry groups are also called point groups in three dimensions. There are five fundamental symmetry classes which have triangular fundamental domains: dihedral, cyclic, tetrahedral, octahedral, and icosahedral symmetry.

This article lists the groups by Schoenflies notation, Coxeter notation, orbifold notation, and order. John Conway uses a variation of the Schoenflies notation, based on the groups' quaternion algebraic structure, labeled by one or two upper case letters, and whole number subscripts. The group order is defined as the subscript, unless the order is doubled for symbols with a plus or minus, "±", prefix, which implies a central inversion.

Hermann–Mauguin notation (International notation) is also given. The crystallography groups, 32 in total, are a subset with element orders 2, 3, 4 and 6.

Involutional symmetry 

There are four involutional groups: no symmetry (C1), reflection symmetry (Cs), 2-fold rotational symmetry (C2), and central point symmetry (Ci).

Cyclic symmetry 

There are four infinite cyclic symmetry families, with n = 2 or higher. (n may be 1 as a special case as no symmetry)

Dihedral symmetry 

There are three infinite dihedral symmetry families, with n = 2 or higher (n may be 1 as a special case).

Polyhedral symmetry 

There are three types of polyhedral symmetry: tetrahedral symmetry, octahedral symmetry, and icosahedral symmetry, named after the triangle-faced regular polyhedra with these symmetries.

Continuous symmetries
All of the discrete point symmetries are subgroups of certain continuous symmetries. They can be classified as products of orthogonal groups O(n) or special orthogonal groups SO(n). O(1) is a single orthogonal reflection, dihedral symmetry order 2, Dih1. SO(1) is just the identity. Half turns, C2, are needed to complete.

See also
Crystallographic point group
Triangle group
List of planar symmetry groups
Point groups in two dimensions

References

Further reading 
 Peter R. Cromwell, Polyhedra (1997), Appendix I

 On Quaternions and Octonions, 2003, John Horton Conway and Derek A. Smith  
 The Symmetries of Things 2008, John H. Conway, Heidi Burgiel, Chaim Goodman-Strauss, 
 Kaleidoscopes: Selected Writings of H.S.M. Coxeter, edited by F. Arthur Sherk, Peter McMullen, Anthony C. Thompson, Asia Ivic Weiss, Wiley-Interscience Publication, 1995,  
 (Paper 22) H.S.M. Coxeter, Regular and Semi Regular Polytopes I, [Math. Zeit. 46 (1940) 380–407, MR 2,10]
 (Paper 23) H.S.M. Coxeter, Regular and Semi-Regular Polytopes II, [Math. Zeit. 188 (1985) 559–591]
 (Paper 24) H.S.M. Coxeter, Regular and Semi-Regular Polytopes III, [Math. Zeit. 200 (1988) 3–45]
 N.W. Johnson: Geometries and Transformations, (2018)  Chapter 11: Finite symmetry groups, Table 11.4 Finite Groups of Isometries in 3-space

External links
 Finite spherical symmetry groups
 
 
 Simplest Canonical Polyhedra of Each Symmetry Type, by David I. McCooey

Polyhedra
Symmetry
Group theory
Spherical symmetry groups, Finite